Admiral Sir Maurice James Mansergh KCB CBE (14 October 1896 – 29 September 1966) was a Royal Navy officer who went on to be Commander-in-Chief, Plymouth.

Early life and education
Mansergh was born in Ealing, Essex, the second son of civil engineer Ernest Lawson Mansergh and grandson of James Mansergh. He was educated at a school near Nuneaton before entering Royal Naval College, Osborne in 1909 as a naval cadet.

Naval career
Mansergh joined the Royal Navy in 1914 at the start of World War I. He served on the staff of the Commander-in-Chief, Mediterranean Fleet from 1934 and then became executive officer on the battleship HMS Rodney from 1936. In 1939 he became director of the Trade Division at the Admiralty where his main role was the protection of shipping.

He served in World War II as deputy assistant chief of the Naval Staff (Trade) and then, from 1941, as captain of the cruiser HMS Gambia. He was made deputy chief of staff and subsequently chief of staff to the Allied naval commander-in-chief for the Normandy Invasion Expeditionary Force in 1943.

After the war, he became commodore commanding 15th Cruiser Squadron and then, from 1946, he became Naval Secretary. He was appointed commander of the 3rd Aircraft Carrier Squadron in 1948 and Fifth Sea Lord and Deputy Chief of Naval Staff (Air) in 1949. His last appointment was as Commander-in-Chief, Plymouth in 1951. He retired in 1954.

References

|-

|-

1896 births
1966 deaths
People from Ealing
Royal Navy admirals
Knights Commander of the Order of the Bath
Commanders of the Order of the British Empire
Lords of the Admiralty
Royal Navy personnel of World War II
Military personnel from Essex